Cars 3 is a 2017 American computer-animated sports comedy-adventure film produced by Pixar Animation Studios for Walt Disney Pictures. The sequel to Cars 2 (2011) and the third installment of the Cars film series, the film was directed by Brian Fee (in his directorial debut) and produced by Kevin Reher and Andrea Warren, from a screenplay written by Kiel Murray, Bob Peterson, and Mike Rich, and a story by Fee, Ben Queen, and the writing team of Eyal Podell and Jonathan E. Stewart. John Lasseter, who directed the first two Cars films, served as executive producer. The returning voices of Owen Wilson, Larry the Cable Guy, Bonnie Hunt, Tony Shalhoub, Guido Quaroni, Cheech Marin, Jenifer Lewis, Paul Dooley, Lloyd Sherr, Michael Wallis, Katherine Helmond and John Ratzenberger are joined by Cristela Alonzo, Chris Cooper, Armie Hammer, Nathan Fillion, Kerry Washington, and Lea DeLaria, in addition to a dozen NASCAR personalities. In the film, Lightning McQueen (Wilson) sets out to prove to a new generation of race cars that he's still at the top of his game, with the help of young technician Cruz Ramirez (Alonzo), to prevent Jackson Storm (Hammer) from winning the Florida 500.

Talks for a third Cars film began in late 2011 after the release of its predecessor, and entered production in 2014, with Lasseter stating that it would be a "very emotional story", and go back to the first film's themes. The production team for the film conducted research on multiple NASCAR racers, particularly older ones, as well as a sports psychoanalyst, while also focusing on McQueen's relationship with Doc Hudson and its meaning. The production utilized a new rendering system, Rix Integration Subsystem (RIS), which was previously used in Finding Dory (2016). New cast members including Hammer and Alonzo were announced in January 2017, followed by Fillion, Washington and DeLaria two months later. Randy Newman, who had worked on the first film, composed the film's score with artists such as Andra Day, James Bay, Brad Paisley and Jorge Blanco contributing tracks for the film.

Cars 3 was first screened for the NASCAR industry in Kannapolis, North Carolina on May 23, 2017, before its theatrical release in the United States on June 16, accompanied by the animated short film Lou. It grossed $383 million worldwide against its $175 million budget, becoming the lowest-grossing film of the franchise, but still a box office success. It received generally positive reviews from critics, with praise for its animation, story, and emotional depth, with many of them deeming it an improvement over its predecessor.

Plot

Five years after competing in the World Grand Prix, Lightning McQueen, now a seven-time Piston Cup champion, finds himself overshadowed by Jackson Storm, a rookie who is part of a new generation of race cars who use the latest technology to improve their performance. As Storm's success progresses throughout the season and attracts other rookies, most of the veterans either retire or are dismissed by their sponsors. In the final race of the season at Los Angeles, Lightning starts falling behind Storm after both of them pitted. He tries to keep up, but in doing so suffers a violent crash, leaving him badly injured and ending his worst season on record prematurely, while Storm goes on to win the Piston Cup.

Four months later, Lightning, who has since recovered from his crash, decides that he will continue racing and calls his sponsors, Rusty and Dusty Rust-eze, who reveal they have sold Rust-eze to a businessman named Sterling. Sterling assigns Lightning to train under Cruz Ramirez, where he struggles to adapt to the modern training methods. After Lightning accidentally damages a simulator, Sterling tries to force him to retire. Adamant that he can still race, Lightning instead offers that if he wins the upcoming Florida 500, he can decide if he wants to keep racing; otherwise he will retire immediately. Sterling reluctantly accepts the deal. Lightning tries to train on nearby Fireball Beach, but ends up spending most of his time teaching Cruz how to drive on the sand. Lightning then attempts to join a race undercover at a famous dirt track called Thunder Hollow, but inadvertently enters a figure-8-style demolition derby with Cruz, which she wins with both of them hiding their identities. Lightning's cover is blown when Cruz accidentally swerves to avoid a water truck, causing him to tumble over and spilling his water on Lightning, adding to his humiliation.

Frustrated for wasted his time taking care of Cruz, Lightning rages at her and accidentally breaks her trophy. An upset Cruz reveals that she had wanted to be a racer just like Lightning all her life, but never started a race due to her feeling that she could never be one. She resigns as Lightning's trainer and heads back to the training center. Guilty and with no other options, Lightning calls his friend Mater for advice. He suggests that Lightning track down Doc Hudson's mentor Smokey, in his hometown of Thomasville, Georgia, so Lightning catches up to Cruz and convinces her to rejoin him. There, he meets up with Smokey, who reveals that despite the fact Doc never raced again, he found new happiness in training Lightning. After accepts the fact that Lightning will never be as fast as Storm, Smokey and Doc's old friends, Louise "Barnstormer" Nash, River Scott, and Junior "Midnight" Moon, help him learn new tricks to overcome his speed disadvantage, using Cruz as his sparring partner. However, during the final practice race, Cruz suddenly overtakes him and he suffers a flashback to his crash, shaking his confidence.

At the Florida 500, Lightning starts at the back, but with assistance from Smokey in the pits, manages to gradually push up the ranks. Sterling, who still believes Lightning can't win, orders Cruz back to the training center to prepare a rookie for the following race, despite her wanting to stay and watch the race. Overhearing the exchange and remembering Cruz's dream of racing, Lightning avoids a massive multi-car pile-up and has his crew outfit her to take his place in the race, believing she is the key to defeating Storm. While shaky at first, Cruz is able to push up the ranks, thanks to Lightning coaching her from the pits, and eventually ends up right behind Storm. Feeling threatened, he tries to intimidate Cruz, even to the point of ramming her against the wall in the final lap. Using one of Doc's old moves, Cruz flips over Storm, overtaking him and winning the race.

As she celebrates her victory, Sterling offers her a role on his team, but she instead takes a counteroffer from Dinoco's owner Tex Dinoco. Since Lightning and Cruz were both wearing #95, both have won the race, meaning that Lightning gets to decide if he is done racing. Some time later, Lightning and Cruz return to Radiator Springs, where Lightning reveals that Tex has bought Rust-eze from Sterling. Now decked in Doc's old racing colors, Lightning decides to continue racing, but trains Cruz first for the season.

Voice cast

 Owen Wilson as Lightning McQueen, a legendary Piston Cup veteran and Sally Carrera's boyfriend. 
 Cristela Alonzo as Cruz Ramirez, Lightning McQueen's trainer.
 Chris Cooper as Smokey, Doc Hudson's former mechanic and crew chief who helps out Lightning and Cruz.
 Nathan Fillion as Sterling, a rich business car and the new Rust-eze team owner.
 Larry the Cable Guy as Mater, a jolly tow truck and Lightning McQueen's best friend.
 Armie Hammer as Jackson Storm,<ref
name="USATCruzRamirez" /> McQueen's new racing rival.
 Tom and Ray Magliozzi as Rusty and Dusty Rust-eze, respectively, the owners of Rust-eze. Following Tom's death in 2014, unused archive recordings from the first film were used for Rusty's lines.
 Tony Shalhoub as Luigi, a Fiat 500.
 Guido Quaroni as Guido, a forklift who is Luigi's partner.
 Bonnie Hunt as Sally Carrera, a Porsche 996, and Lightning McQueen's girlfriend.
 Lea DeLaria as Miss Fritter, an intimidating monster school bus at the Thunder Hollow demolition derby.
 Kerry Washington as Natalie Certain, a statistical analyst.
 Bob Costas as Bob Cutlass, a race commentator.
 Margo Martindale as Louise "Barnstormer" Nash, a white 1950 Nash Ambassador and a retired Piston Cup racer from the 1950s who was one of the three legends to live in Thomasville with Smokey.
 Isiah Whitlock Jr. as River Scott, a grey and black 1938 Dirt Track Racer and retired Piston Cup racer who is one of Smokey's friends.
 Bob Peterson as Chick Hicks, a former rival of Lightning who now hosts his own talk show called "Chick's Picks" on Racing Sports Network. He was originally voiced by Michael Keaton in the first film.
 Bob Peterson also voices Dr. Damage, a white and orange modified ambulance who partakes in the Crazy 8 demolition derby.
 John Ratzenberger as Mack, a 1985 Mack Super-Liner.
 Lewis Hamilton as Hamilton, Cruz' personal voice command assistant.
 Lloyd Sherr as Fillmore, a Volkswagen Type 2 microbus.
 Junior Johnson as Junior "Midnight" Moon, a black 1940 Ford Standard Coupe and a retired Piston Cup racer who is one of Smokey's friends.
 Cheech Marin as Ramone, a 1959 Chevrolet Impala coupé Lowrider that owns the "Ramone's House of Body Art" store.
 Katherine Helmond as Lizzie, a 1923 Ford Model T Coupe who is the elderly owner of a roadside souvenir and accessory shop (Radiator Springs Curios). This was Helmond's final appearance in the Cars franchise before her death in 2019.
 Paul Dooley as Sarge, a 1941 Willys Jeep.
 Jenifer Lewis as Flo, the owner of "Flo's V-8 Café" and Ramone's wife.
 Madeleine McGraw as Maddy McGear, a young car who is Lightning McQueen's biggest fan.
 Michael Wallis as Sheriff, a 1949 Mercury Eight Police Cruiser police car.
 Jerome Ranft as Red, a 1960s closed-cab Whitney Seagrave fire engine. He was originally voiced by Joe Ranft in the first film.
 Angel Oquendo as Bobby Swift, a Piston Cup racer and one of Lightning's best friends.
 Diedrich Bader as Brick Yardley, a Piston Cup racer and one of Lightning's best friends. 
 Andra Day as Sweet Tea, a forklift and Louise Nash's former pitty who is now a singer at the Cotter Pin bar.

Additionally, several drivers and other racing-related personalities from NASCAR made cameo appearances, including Chase Elliott as Chase Racelott, Ryan Blaney as Ryan "Inside" Laney, Bubba Wallace as Bubba Wheelhouse, Shannon Spake as Shannon Spokes, Daniel Suárez as Danny Swervez, Ray Evernham as Ray Reverham, and Mike Joy as Mike Joyride. Richard Petty returns in the role of Strip "The King" Weathers, while his son Kyle Petty voices Cal Weathers. Humpy Wheeler, Jeff Gordon, and Darrell Waltrip all return from their previous Cars appearances as Tex Dinoco, Jeff Gorvette, and Darrell Cartrip, respectively. Paul Newman appears as Doc Hudson through the use of unused audio recordings from the first film.

Production
Development on Cars 3 began in late 2011 after the release of Cars 2, and by March 2014, pre-production on the film was underway. In October 2014, Pixar's former chief creative officer John Lasseter revealed at the Tokyo International Film Festival that the film would feature a tribute to Hayao Miyazaki's film The Castle of Cagliostro, in a form of an old Citroën 2CV.

Prior to the film's release, John Lasseter, who had directed the previous Cars films, stated that the film would have a "very emotional story", similar in tone to the first film. Co-writer Kiel Murray, who also co-wrote the original Cars, said of the return to the series' roots, "With these franchises you always want to know who it's about. The first movie was about McQueen, and the second movie was a sort of off-ramp to the Mater story. We wanted to get back to the McQueen story. When we looked at what would be next for him, we wondered what that would be like both as an athlete, and also for what he was dealing with in the rest of his life."

According to director Brian Fee, the production team did a lot of research, and, while they "looked at athletes in other sports", the team mainly focused on NASCAR racers. Fee said that they "even talked to a sports psychoanalyst who explained that many of these drivers can't imagine themselves doing anything else", an idea that resonated with the team. Mike Rich said that rookies taking over the sport is a "kind of endless story in sports" and compared McQueen to Wayne Gretzky and Misty May-Treanor as well as many others. Fee said that "being a parent became [his] main resource to find and understand the emotion" in the film's storyline. Scott Morse, the film's story supervisor, said that he wanted to highlight the film's emotional core and the character's relationships, wanting the film to feel like a sports film while also focusing on McQueen realizing "what their relationship meant to Doc".

On January 5, 2017, it was announced that Armie Hammer and Cristela Alonzo would voice Jackson Storm and Cruz Ramirez, respectively. Two months later, Nathan Fillion, Kerry Washington and Lea DeLaria joined the cast.

The production utilized a new rendering mode, Rix Integration Subsystem (RIS), which made scenes like the demolition derby race possible. The system was previously used in Finding Dory (2016). In previous Pixar films, the animators had to do the animation first before the rendering, but RIS allowed animation and rendering to take place simultaneously in a process called "hardware shading", making it much easier for the animators to see what a completed scene would look like when finished.

Fee said that the film's animation is "art directed realism" and stated that it causes the film's characters and sets to "feel more real and alive than ever before", while Bill Cone, the film's production designer, said that "The term [they] use is believability, which is the basis for everything [Pixar does]". Global technology supervisor Sudeep Rangaswamy said that his team used an automatic process for the film's shots, which, in his words "allows a lot of flexibility" and that "It made shots that were previously impossible to render possible". Director of photography-camera Jeremy Lasky and editor Jason Hudak researched NASCAR footage for the film's race scenes.

Music

Fee said that both the score and the soundtrack "really help support the story we are telling". Both the soundtrack and the score were released on June 16, 2017.

Soundtrack

The soundtrack features "Run That Race", an original song written and performed by Dan Auerbach, who stated the song is "about never giving up and always trying your best". Auerbach said that the filmmakers showed him the story and some dialogue, from which he pieced together a story for the song. The soundtrack also features "Ride", an original song performed by ZZ Ward featuring Gary Clark Jr., which was released as a single on April 14, 2017.

Score

The film's score was composed by Pixar's frequent collaborator, Randy Newman, who previously composed the first film's score.  Tom MacDougall, Disney's executive vice-president of music, said that Newman has "a real connection to the Cars world" and that "His ability to capture the feelings on this film, its characters, locations, and the Americana theme throughout is extraordinary-the music is so naturally fluid and inspired. It really feels like Randy is coming home with this score." Newman quoted tracks from the first film in moments where Fee "wanted to evoke an earlier time".

Release

Theatrical
Cars 3 was released in theaters on Friday, June 16, 2017, in the United States, in 3D, Dolby Cinema and selected IMAX theaters, accompanied by the Pixar short film Lou. The film had a special screening for the NASCAR industry in Kannapolis, North Carolina on May 23, 2017. The world premiere was held in Anaheim, California on June 10, 2017.

Video game

A tie-in video game has been announced to accompany the film's release. It was developed by Avalanche Software, which was shut down by Disney in 2016, but was acquired and revived by Warner Bros. Interactive Entertainment. It was released on Nintendo Switch, PlayStation 3, PlayStation 4, Wii U, Xbox 360, and Xbox One on June 13, 2017, in North America, in Europe and Australia on July 14, 2017, and in Japan on July 20, 2017. As Disney no longer develops and publishes video games after the release of Disney Infinity 3.0, Warner Bros. Interactive Entertainment published the tie-in game.

Home media
Cars 3 was released on Digital HD on October 24, 2017, and was released on DVD, Blu-ray, and 4K Ultra HD Blu-ray on November 7, 2017, by Walt Disney Studios Home Entertainment.

Short film
The BBC, Disney and Lego released a short film via YouTube, on April 13, 2018, that is inspired by both the Cars franchise as well as the popular TV series Top Gear. The film tells the story of Lightning McQueen's trip to the Top Gear track, where he achieves his dream of racing against the Stig.

Reception

Box office
Cars 3 grossed $152.9 million in the United States and Canada and $231 million in other territories for a worldwide total of $383.9 million, against a production budget of $175 million.

In North America, Cars 3 was released alongside Rough Night, 47 Meters Down and All Eyez on Me, and was projected to gross $55–60 million from 4,256 theaters in its opening weekend. It made $2.8 million from Thursday night previews and $19.5 million on its first day. It went on to open to $53.7 million, finishing first at the box office and dethroning two-time first-place finisher Wonder Woman. Cars 3 had the lowest opening of the series, but nevertheless was the 16th Pixar film to debut at number one. In its second weekend, the film grossed $24.1 million, dropping to third place, behind Transformers: The Last Knight and Wonder Woman. In its third weekend the film made $9.7 million ($14.1 million over the five-day 4 July holiday weekend), dropping to fifth.

Critical response
On review aggregator Rotten Tomatoes, the film holds an approval rating of 69% based on 233 reviews with an average rating of 6.10/10. The website's critical consensus reads, "Cars 3 has an unexpectedly poignant story to go with its dazzling animation, suggesting Pixar's most middle-of-the-road franchise may have a surprising amount of tread left." On Metacritic, which assigns a normalized rating, the film has a score of 59 out of 100, based on reviews from 41 critics, indicating "mixed or average reviews". Audiences polled by CinemaScore gave the film an average grade of "A" on an A+ to F scale.

The movie was considered an improvement over its predecessor by critics. Owen Gleiberman of Variety wrote, "Cars 3 is a friendly, rollicking movie made with warmth and dash, and to the extent that it taps our primal affection for this series, it more than gets the job done. Yet in many ways it's the tasteful version of a straight-to-DVD (or streaming) sequel." David Fear of Rolling Stone gave the film a positive review, saying: "There's an emotional resonance to this story about growing old, chasing glory days and the joy of passing the baton that leaves the other two films choking on its digitally rendered dust. The end goal this time out isn't just to sell a few more toys and Lightning McQueen lunchboxes. It's actually tapping into something deeper than a corporate bottom line." Mike Ryan of Uproxx called the film "the Rocky III of the Cars franchise", and wrote "There's a hint of sadness that seems to be present throughout Cars 3 that gives it a little more weight than the previous installments."

Alonso Duralde of TheWrap gave the film a mixed review, saying: "As a spawner of merchandise, Cars 3 fires on all pistons but, as a movie, it's a harmless but never stimulating 109 minutes." Vicky Roach of News.com.au gave the film 3 out of 4 stars, saying: "Returning to the iconic, backroads nostalgia of the original film, Cars 3 puts the flashy, unpopular middle film squarely in its rear vision mirror. The route that the filmmakers take might be familiar, but after gunning it, they take the corners like pros."

Accolades

Possible sequel
Regarding a possible Cars 4, Cars 3 producers Kevin Reher and Andrea Warren stated speaking to Cinema Blend that "If there's a good story to tell, I mean, our heads kinda break after having gotten this one done, like "Oh my god," what could you do the further adventures of? But like any sequel, from Toy Story 4 to Incredibles 2, as long as there's a good story to tell it's worth investing, we do love these characters, we love them as much as the public does." Regarding which character would be the main protagonist in the film, Reher and Warren stated that "if Cruz is a breakout character, kind of like Mater was, she would be involved in a 4". Owen Wilson stated at a Cars 3 press event that possible stories have been discussed for a Cars 4, though he would personally like for a fourth Cars film to delve into aspects of the thriller genre, akin to Cars 2. In an interview with Screen Rant, Lea DeLaria expressed interest in reprising her role as Miss Fritter while promoting the release of the short film, Miss Fritter's Racing Skoool with the Cars 3 DVD and Blu-ray release.

Notes

References

External links

 
 
 

2010s American animated films
2010s children's animated films
2010s buddy comedy films
2010s children's comedy films
2010s comedy road movies
2010s English-language films
2010s fantasy comedy films
2017 3D films
2017 comedy films
2017 computer-animated films
2017 directorial debut films
2017 films
3D animated films
American 3D films
American buddy comedy films
American children's animated comedy films
American comedy road movies
American computer-animated films
American fantasy comedy films
American sequel films
Animated buddy films
Animated films set in Florida
Animated films set in Los Angeles
Animated sports films
Cars (franchise)
Films scored by Randy Newman

Films set in Georgia (U.S. state)
IMAX films
Pixar animated films
Walt Disney Pictures animated films